Millicent Sullivan is an American chemist and the Centennial Professor and Associate Chair in Chemical & Biomolecular Engineering at the University of Delaware. She is a Fellow of the American Institute for Medical and Biological Engineering. Her research considers the development of polymeric materials for targeted drug delivery and the mechanisms that underpin cell – drug interactions.

Early life and education 
Sullivan completed her undergraduate studies at Princeton University. She moved to Carnegie Mellon University for her graduate research, where she focussed on chemical engineering. Sullivan was a Ruth L. Kirschstein postdoctoral fellow at the Benaroya Research Institute. At Benaroya Sullivan worked alongside the biochemist Emily Helene Sage.

Research and career 
In 2006 Sullivan joined the University of Delaware. Sullivan is interested in how therapeutics, including nucleic acid treatments and conventional pharmaceuticals, interact with abnormally behaving cells. Targeted drug release offers the potential to improve the prognosis of various medical conditions. At the University of Delaware she was awarded an National Science Foundation CAREER Award that allowed her to study the interaction of cells with gene delivery systems. She makes use polymer-base biomaterials to package DNA-based therapeutics.

She was selected to attend the National Academy of Engineering Frontiers Symposium in 2010. Alongside drug delivery, Sullivan looks to better understand the process of wound healing. She makes use of advanced gene therapies to help people with chronic, non-healing conditions.

Awards and honours 

 2011 Outstanding Junior Faculty
 2013 Georgia Tech Frontiers in Bioengineering Young Investigator
 2017 Elected Fellow of the American Institute for Medical and Biological Engineering
 2020 Fulbright Program Fellowship

Select publications

Personal life 
Sullivan plays the violin.

References 

Fellows of the American Institute for Medical and Biological Engineering
University of Delaware faculty
Carnegie Mellon University alumni
Princeton University alumni
Biomedical engineers
Year of birth missing (living people)
Living people